Zuabu was according to the Assyrian King List (AKL) the 11th Assyrian monarch, ruling in Assyria's early period, though he is not attested in any known contemporary artefacts. He is among the "seventeen kings who lived in tents" within the Mesopotamian Chronicles. Zuabu is in the lists preceded by Hana, and succeeded by Nuabu.

See also

 Timeline of the Assyrian Empire
 Early Period of Assyria
 List of Assyrian kings
 Assyrian continuity
 Assyrian people
 Assyria

References

23rd-century BC Assyrian kings